Landscape planning is a branch of landscape architecture. According to Erv Zube (1931–2002) landscape planning is defined as an activity concerned with developing landscaping amongst competing land uses while protecting natural processes and significant cultural and natural resources. Park systems and greenways of the type designed by Frederick Law Olmsted are key examples of landscape planning. Landscape designers tend to work for clients who wish to commission construction work. Landscape planners analyze broad issues as well as project characteristics which constrain design projects.

Landscape planners may work on projects which are of broad geographical scope, concern many land uses or many clients or are implemented over a long period of time. As an example, the damage caused by unplanned mineral extraction was one of the early reasons for a public demand for landscape planning.

In Europe
Alberti wrote on the need for town squares for markets and specific implementations to make most use of the space. In North Europe this developed into the idea that residential squares should be planned around green spaces. The first space of this type was the Place des Vosges. Residential squares were also made in Britain and their planning developed into the idea of incorporating public open space (public parks within towns). Frederick Law Olmsted gave momentum to this idea with his proposal for a park systems in Boston - the famous Emerald Necklace. Patrick Abercrombie took up this idea and incorporated it in his great 1943-4 Open Space Plan for the County of London. An example of landscape planning in use is the plans of RWE in the wake of its mining operations and how they plan to use leftover detritus and soil in their re-cultivation efforts to restore the damaged ecosystems and landscapes created by open pit mines (e.g. Garzweiler surface mine).

In the US 
In the United States, landscape architects provide landscape planning services focused on the natural environment along with urban planners. But, unlike Canada and Europe, the US does not have a national land use planning system. Frederick Law Olmsted and Ian McHarg are two influential American landscape architects that also worked as planners. McHarg's work on overlay landscape planning contributed to the development of GIS and to the foundation of ESRI by Jack Dangermond.

Legislation
The principles of landscape planning are now incorporated in various types of legislation and policy documents. In America, the National Environmental Policy Act was influenced by the work of Ian McHarg on Environmental impact assessment. In Germany, the Federal Nature Conservation Act requires the preparation of landscape plans. For the Europe Union as a whole, the European Landscape Convention has wide-ranging implications for the design and planning of relationships between development and the landscape. In Asia, major development projects are taking place and illustrating the need for good landscape planning. The Three Gorges Dam, for example, will have extensive impacts on the landscape. They have been planned to a degree but future monitoring of the project is likely to show that better landscape planning and design would have been possible.

Methodology
The conventional planning process is a linear progression of activities. The common steps are:

Identification of problems and opportunities.
Establishment of goals.
Inventory and analysis of the biophysical environment.
Human community inventory and analysis.
Development of concepts and the selection of options.
Adoption of a plan.
Community involvement and education.
Detailed design.
Plan implementation.
Plan administration.

Landscape planning not always means an ecological planning method, for that it must be considered that "planning is a process that uses the scientific and technical information for considering and reaching consensus on a range of choices. Ecology is the study of the relationship of all living things, including people, to their biological and physical environments. Ecological planning then may be defined as the use of biophysical and sociocultural information to suggest opportunities and constraints for decision making about the use of landscape". (Steiner, 1991) While the common steps are listed above, the process of Landscape planning is adaptable to many situations and is useful in many ways depending on the goals for which it is used.

Impacts & Implications 
Results of proper implementations of landscape planning practices are not only limited to more functional landscapes. It can also influence for the better many aspects of the environment and community in which it is used to its potential. While the chief purpose of landscape planning is for ecological reasons it can impact so much more when used effectively as a tool.

Ecology 
Landscape planning is mainly used for ecological purposes and functions best when the result of the planning process is the least amount of interruption of ecological factors from before the implementation ever went into place. In this practice landscape planning can be used to not only maintain the status of the existing environment, but also can be used to improve aspects of previously under performing ecosystems, for example, designing to increase biodiversity. For example Landscape planning could be used to create additional habitat for endangered species, and reclamation of previously used or depleted lands (e.g. old agricultural spaces) for expansion of natural ecosystems. This also includes planning in order to reduce the impact of the changes to the environment. with proper landscape planning, a greater speed of recovery for the ecosystems of interrupted spaces is achievable.

Health 
similar to the impacts of healing gardens, the positive healing effects of proper implementations of planned landscapes are of great benefit. When people are exposed to nature, they would find that their overall mood had improved and that they recover from stress and illness at an accelerated rate. With the proper use of landscape planning, health within an urban leaning environment in regards to stress and recovery can be greatly improved above the unplanned alternative. When landscape planning is used to properly conserve ecological systems that may have been displaced, it makes it so recreational use of the environment is maintained while conserving the systems for people to enjoy.

Use of other technologies in context 
The development of GIS technology such as those developed by ESRI, have great import to the practice of Landscape planning. Use of assisting technology allows for the conditions and factors existing in a landscape to be easily aggregated and analyzed. Through the use of GIS technology you are able to answer many of the questions about a landscape that is in question. such as, "how functional is this landscape?" or "to what extent do the factors outside of the site affect the planning that needs to be done?" The use of technology that is developing with greater and greater accuracy has the ability to make sustainable developments easier and more common across the globe.

See also

Footnotes
 Landscape planning education in America: retrospect and prospect
Ecological design and planning George F. Thompson and Frederick R. Steiner, (Wiley, 1997)
Landscape planning : an introduction to theory and practice Hackett, Brian (Oriel, 1971)
Landscape planning and environmental impact design Tom Turner (2nd ed UCL Press, 1998)
Design with nature Ian L. McHarg ( Wiley, 1992)
The living landscape: an ecological approach to landscape planning Steiner, Frederick R. (McGraw-Hill College, 1991)

References

External links 
 European Landscape Convention (official statement by the Council of Europe).

Landscape
Landscape architecture
Environmental design
Sustainable design